Magkaibigan is a 2008 Philippine drama film written and directed by Jose Javier Reyes. The film stars Christopher de Leon, Jinggoy Estrada, Maricel Laxa and Dawn Zulueta. This is Maverick Films' last feature film for the decade.

It was one of the entries in the 2008 Metro Manila Film Festival, where it won Best Actor award.

Cast
 Jinggoy Estrada as Ruben
 Christopher de Leon as Atoy
 Maricel Laxa as Eden
 Dawn Zulueta as Tere
 Ryan Julio as Benjie
 AJ Perez as Joni
 Justine Plummer as Dodie
 Bobby Andrews as Lito
 Tirso Cruz III as Noni
 Malou O'Connor as Elvie
 Kathy Mori as Yolly
 Empress Schuck as Katrina
 Boots Abalantac as Nita
 Millet Alcoran  as Aileen
 Jhoana Marie Tan as Mavic
 Marvin Kiefer as David
 Bianca Aguila as Mayen
 Benjie Cayetano as Mr. Cabredo
 Alchris Galura as lger
 Harold Oide as Carlo
 Jana Roxas as Maya
 April Sun as Maya's Friend
 Raquel Villavicencio as Dr. Marcelo
 Mikko Agoncillo as Nurse
 Lui Manansala as Dr. Protacio
 Lai Tejuco as Yolly
 Cliff Riego de Dios as Fr. Perez

Awards

References

External links

2008 films
2008 drama films
Filipino-language films
Philippine drama films
Maverick Films films